Lilliput is a district of Poole, Dorset. It borders on Sandbanks, Canford Cliffs, Lower Parkstone, and Whitecliff and has a shoreline within Poole Harbour with views of Brownsea Island and the Purbeck Hills.

Brownsea Island stands opposite Lilliput's harbour foreshore and is famous as the birthplace of Baden Powell's International Scouting Movement. Lilliput itself was host to a number of early scouting camps. During the Second World War at one stage it provided Britain's only civilian air route: Poole Harbour was temporary home to the Imperial Airways/BOAC flying boat fleet, which had its passenger HQ at Salterns Marina.Well known residents have included modernist writer Mary Butts, a very young John le Carre and disc-jockey Tony Blackburn. Impresario Fred Karno who popularised the custard-pie-in-the-face comedy routine spent his last years in the village as a part-owner of an off-licence, bought with financial help from Charlie Chaplin, and died here in 1941 aged 75.

Evening Hill is at the edge of Parkstone Bay.

Development 

The area occupying the northern shore of Poole Harbour was often referred to by the Victorians as "Parkstone-on-Sea". Mary Butts wrote about the local landscape and her childhood in one of the old mansions at the turn of the twentieth century in her autobiography The Crystal Cabinet: my childhood at Salterns (1937). Her great-grandfather had been a principal patron of the English romantic poet and artist William Blake, and her Lilliput home housed a large collection of Blake paintings (now in Tate Britain). The autobiography took its title from one of Blake's poems. She adored the area and was critical of the kind of development then taking place in Lilliput and Poole–Parkstone–Bournemouth, which she thought soulless, and far from the "garden city" it could be. Aside from an enclave behind Evening Hill, a local beauty spot with panoramic views over Poole Harbour, modern development started in the later 1920s as more of the older estates were sold for suburban projects. A number of distinctive art-deco homes were built, including the landmark Salterns Court building at the new shopping parade.

Before its development as a residential and recreational area there had been industrial projects at Salterns, which had been the district's local name. Some claim a connection to Jonathan Swift and his novel Gulliver's Travels, and there are local streets which have associated names. The name "Lilliput" probably derives from Lilliput House, an old country mansion built near Evening Hill, which may have been owned by renowned smuggler Isaac Gulliver or one of his relatives.

Lilliput is host to a number of sailing clubs based on the harbour shoreline. A recent proposal for a major redevelopment at Salterns Marina, has sparked controversy about who will benefit from this. Despite strong local opposition Poole Councillors approved the scheme in May 2016, with planning chairman Pawlowski claiming "this town needs to protect its economy and to provide jobs ... we should be taking advantage of our harbour to promote and help our area .” An idea of contemporary Lilliput can be gained by following the local circular walk (1c) described by Poole Harbour Trails.

Today 
Recent years have seen many new property development projects, especially in water frontage or harbour view locations, and often earlier buildings have been replaced entirely.

Lilliput is home to a hotel 'Salterns Harbourside', the Lilliput C of E Infants First School, and an Anglican church 'The Church of the Holy Angels'. A recent census (2005) indicated the number of electors as 3048 with the largest single group (29%) being 65+yrs of age, the majority of homes are privately owned, and a significant number of homes (22%) are households of one member who is a pensioner;  many households (14%) consist of married couples with dependent children; most residents who work are professional people and many work in Poole or Bournemouth.

The dilemma of development is described in The Dorset Village Book: "much of Lilliput's woodland has disappeared, the sound of saws rasping through the trunks as prominent as the speeding traffic along the road to Sandbanks. Almost every inch of this beautiful place has been sacrificed to the builders and even parts of the cliff-face have been built on. Who can blame anyone for wanting to come here to live, to enjoy the rich sunsets over Wareham Channel, to smell the sweet cool breezes which waft in from the bay, and to marvel at the view across Poole Harbour and Brownsea Island. To many, this is paradise."

References

External links
  (click on any image to view in media-viewer)
 The Poole Flying Boats  
 Lilliput's industrial past 
 About the name and the areas' development 
 'Welcome to Poole' Lilliput entry
 The Dorset Village Book  Harry & Hugh Ashley, published by Countryside Book 
 Google Earth view
 Google Maps view
 Salterns from above
 'About Lilliput' presentation'
 'Looking Back at Lilliput' Iris A Morris (1999)
 'Parkstone-on-Sea' Jeremy Waters (2014)

Areas of Poole
Poole Harbour